The Rodenbek is a right-hand, northern tributary of the River Alster in North Germany and, together with the Bredenbek and Lottbek, as well as other small streams, is part of the meltwater basin of the Rodenbek Glacial Valley (Rodenbeker Quellental) that was formed in the Weichselian Ice Age.

Like the other rivers in the glacial valley, the Rodenbek flows in an east–west direction to the Alster, a tributary of the Elbe.

As well as being home to fish that occur in the Alster, burbot, sunbleak, common dace and stickleback have also been observed in the Rodenbek. The ponds of the Rodenbeker Teiche, 2.8 hectares in area, with their water lilies are looked after by the Rahlstedt Anglers (Sportfischerverein Rahlstedt von 1934 e. V.) and stocked with carp, tench, pike, perch and eel.

References

External links 
 Verwunschene Rodenbek (Hamburger Abendblatt)

See also
List of rivers of Hamburg

Rivers of Hamburg
Rivers of Germany